Cerithium egenum is a species of sea snail, a marine gastropod mollusk in the family Cerithiidae.

Description

Distribution
The distribution of Cerithium egenum includes the Western Central Pacific.
 Indonesia
 Guam

References

Cerithiidae
Gastropods described in 1849